Jacques Depelchin (born 06/03/1942) is a Congolese historian and militant. He is the Co-Founder and Executive Director of the Ota Benga International Alliance for Peace in the DR Congo.

Background
A native of the Congo, Depelchin was educated internationally, beginning in the Democratic Republic of the Congo with Lovanium University in Kinshasa before relocating to England to attend the University of London, to Italy to attend Johns Hopkins University and to the United States to attend Stanford University. After completing his education, he taught African History at a number of universities in the United States, in his home country, in Mozambique and Tanzania.

Depelchin worked as a secretariat for the Alliance of Democratic Forces for the Liberation of Congo, which helped bring Laurent-Désiré Kabila to power.  From 1996-2002, he was a member of the Rally for Congolese Democracy, opposing Kabila, being identified in 2000 by The New York Times as among the group's leaders.

Books

Reclaiming African History
From the Congo Free State to Zaire: 1885 - 1974, 1999Silences in African History'', 2000

References

External links
 Ota Benga Alliance

Year of birth missing (living people)
Living people
Democratic Republic of the Congo pan-Africanists
Marxist humanists
Democratic Republic of the Congo Africanists
Writers about Africa
Rally for Congolese Democracy politicians
Democratic Republic of the Congo non-fiction writers
Democratic Republic of the Congo historians
Democratic Republic of the Congo philosophers
Alumni of the University of London
Lovanium University alumni
Historians of the Democratic Republic of the Congo